The 1900 Coupe Van der Straeten Ponthoz was the 1st staging of the Coupe Van der Straeten Ponthoz, which is regarded as one of the first European trophies. The tournament was held in Brussels, Belgium, between 15 and 17 April 1900.

The tournament was won by R.A.P., who played and defeated the reigning champions of Belgium (Racing Club), the Netherlands (H.V.V.) and Switzerland (Grasshopper Club) on three successive days. As these three were the only existing leagues in continental Europe at the time, the local newspapers dubbed the tournament the club championship of the continent, and thus, R.A.P. might be considered the first ever continental European Champions.

Participants
Belgium, the Netherlands, Switzerland and France sent their best and most prestigious club sides to the tournament (Austria and Germany clubs had also been invited to enter but did not register). The hosts, Belgium, sent three teams, Antwerp Daring Club (a second-level side), Royal Léopold FC and reigning national champions Racing Club de Bruxelles. The Netherlands sent two teams, R.A.P. and the then Dutch champions (H.V.V.), while Switzerland and France sent one each, Swiss champions Grasshopper Club and Iris Club Lille (now Lille OSC), which had won the 1899 French Championship.

Overview 
Because they were 7 teams, two received a bye to the semi-finals while the other five would have to face off for the remaining two spots in the semis. Antwerp Daring Club, who was a second-level side, withdrew after the draw as they were to play fellow Belgians Léopold in a preliminary round, with the winners meeting H.V.V. in the first round. They were not replaced, so Léopold qualified for the first round by default. The only two clubs who weren't either Belgian or Dutch, Grasshopper and Iris, were the two teams who got the byes to the semi-finals, however, the latter withdrew for unclear reasons, so they had to be replaced by a "B team" of Racing (which, like the main team, could only include the maximum number of five English players).

All matches at the field of Léopold FC at Chaussée de Waterloo 513. The tournament ended up being a nightmare for the hosts, as Belgium's two main teams were knocked out in the first round by the two Dutch clubs in front of their own fans, which the local newspapers dubbed as "a national humiliation". The two Dutch clubs then beat "Racing II" and Switzerland's Grasshopper in the semi-finals, meaning that what might be the first-ever European final in history was an all-Dutch affair between H.V.V and R.A.P. The final, which was held on 16 April 1900 at The Hague, saw R.A.P. lift the trophy after upsetting the national champions with a 2–1 victory, thanks to two late goals, one from Jan van den Berg, who had netted two in the semi-finals, and the winner from Julius Hisgen.

Bracket

Results

First round
Bye (2):
  Grasshopper Club
  Iris Club Lille (replaced by "Racing II")

Note: Gorter, Van den Berg (both Haarlem) were guest players.

Note: Miel Mundt played for H.V.V. as a guest player.

Semi-finals

Note: Grasshopper reportedly included one English player (the outside left) and one Dutch player, captain Harry Blĳdensteĳn, who scored his side's two goals.

Final

Winner

Statistics

Top Scorers

Aftermath
After the tournament, Grasshopper played three friendlies in the Netherlands, albeit without some first-choice players who had played in their semifinal clash:

Legacy
The tournament was organized as a punctual international competition between European clubs. However, its success led to the introduction of the Coupe Vanden Abeele in Antwerp in the following year, originally intended as another international club tournament, but eventually the starting point for the Low Countries derby.

The 1900 Coupe Van der Straeten Ponthoz is generally considered informally as the first European tournament, although this title is also contested by the Challenge Cup, a competition between clubs in Austria-Hungary which started three years before, in 1897. However, this tournament up until the 1900–01 season, only featured teams from Vienna, so the 7–0 win by Vienna Cricket over Wiener FC 1898 on 21 November 1897 may not be regarded as the first ever truly international club final.

See also
 1895 World Championship
 1897 Challenge Cup
 1909 Sir Thomas Lipton Trophy

References

1900–01 in European football
Defunct international club association football competitions in Europe
1900–01 in Belgian football
1900–01 in Swiss football
1900–01 in French football
1900 in Dutch sport